Lengipromez  is a Russian engineering company.

The Open Joint-Stock Company “Lengipromez” is a legal successor of the Leningrad State Institute for Designing Iron and Steel Plants (Lengipromez) constituted by a Decree of the Government in 1926.

In 2003 the Institute has been granted the TϋV CERT Certificate for compliance with the DIN EN ISO 9001-2000 requirements.

List of the Engineering and Consulting Services Rendered by “Lengipromez” 
Severstal, Ironmaking Plant
Uralskaya Stal, Electric Furnace Shop
Magnitogorsk Iron and Steel Works, 1929-1934

Services
Lengipromez prepares designs of the units included into the makeup of a metallurgical complex as well as of the allied units and facilities:
Mechanical – repair shops and foundries;
Metallurgical departments at machine – building plants;
Nature conservation projects;
Utilities facilities with implementation of the advanced energy- saving technologies;
Infrastructure units.

Awards
Order of the Red Banner of Labour, 1976
Jubilee Medal "50 Years of the Armed Forces of the USSR"
 the Red Banner of the Ministry of Ferrous Metallurgy of the USSR etc.

References

External links 
 Company website

Engineering companies of Russia
Companies based in Saint Petersburg